Pukara (Aymara for fortress, Hispanicized spelling Pucara) is a   mountain in the Chilla-Kimsa Chata mountain range in the Andes of Bolivia. It is situated in the La Paz Department, Ingavi Province, Guaqui Municipality. The Chilla River flows along its western slope. It is a tributary of Wiñaymarka Lake, the southern branch of Lake Titicaca.

References 

Mountains of La Paz Department (Bolivia)